Rosalío Solano (August 30, 1914 – August 20, 2009) was a Mexican award-winning cinematographer of the Golden Age of Mexican cinema, perhaps best known for his work in the film Talpa; which won him the Silver Ariel for Best Cinematography of 1957.

Selected work
 Streetwalker (1951)
 Where the Circle Ends (1956) 
Corazón salvaje (1956)
Talpa (1956)
Happiness (1957)
 His First Love (1960)
Tom Thumb and Little Red Riding Hood (1962)
Tlayucan (1962)
Always Further On (1965)
La Valentina (1966)
Su Excelencia (1967)
5 de chocolate y 1 de fresa (1968)
Slaughter (1972)
The Cay (1974)
Do You Hear the Dogs Barking? (1975)
Length of War (1976)
La Casa del Pelícano (1978)
Puerto Maldito (1979)
La Pachanga (1981)

References

External links

Mexican cinematographers
1914 births
2009 deaths